This is a list of Cal State Fullerton Titans football players in the NFL Draft.

Key

Selections

References

Cal State Fullerton

Cal State Fullerton Titans in the NFL Draft
Cal State Fullerton Titans NFL Draft